Salaria is a genus of fish in the family Blenniidae. It contains both freshwater and marine species which are found around the Mediterranean Sea and the eastern Atlantic Ocean. One species, the peacock blenny, has colonised the northern Red Sea through the Suez Canal, a process knowns as anti-Lesspesian migration.

Species
There are currently five recognized species in this genus:
 Salaria atlantica Doadrio, Perea & Yahyaoui, 2011
 Salaria basilisca (Valenciennes, 1836)
 Salaria economidisi Kottelat, 2004 (Trichonis blenny)
 Salaria fluviatilis (Asso, 1801) (Freshwater blenny)
 Salaria pavo (A. Risso, 1810) (Peacock blenny)

References

 
Salarinae
Taxonomy articles created by Polbot